The Springfield Model 1865 was an early breech-loading rifle manufactured by U.S. Armory in Springfield, Massachusetts. It was a modification of the Springfield Model 1861. It was later replaced with the Springfield Model 1866.

Description
During the U.S. Civil War, the advantage of breech-loading rifles became obvious. The rifled muskets used during the war had a rate of fire of 2 or 3 rounds per minute. Breech-loading rifles increased the rate of fire to 8 to 10 rounds per minute with the additional advantage that they can be easily loaded from a prone, rather than standing, position, reducing the rifleman's visible cross section and thus vulnerability to counter-fire. As the Civil War drew to a close, the U.S. Ordnance Department requested prototypes of breech-loading weapons from arms manufacturers all over the world.

After considerable testing, the prototype developed by Erskine S. Allin of the government-operated Springfield Armory was chosen for its simplicity and the fact that it could be produced by the modification of existing Springfield Model 1863 muskets. These modifications cost about $5 per rifle (around $73 adjusted for inflation), which was a significant savings at a time when new rifles cost about $20 each (around $292 adjusted for inflation). Patent No. 49,959 was issued to Erskine S. Allin on September 19, 1865, describing the design.

Specifications

The conversion from musket to breech-loader was done by milling open the barrel's breech section and inserting a hinged breechblock fastened to the top of the barrel. A thumb-operated cam latch at the rear of the breechblock held it shut when in closed position. The rack-type system extractor was withdrawn automatically as the breech-block was opened and snapped back at the end of its stroke. The firing pin was housed within the breech-block. The hammer nose was flattened to accommodate the firing pin.

The breech mechanism employed a hinged breechblock that rotated up and forward, resembling the movement of a trapdoor, to open the breech of the rifle and permit insertion of a cartridge. The hinged breechblock caused these rifles to be named "Trapdoor Springfields".

Approximately 5,000 Civil War Model 1861 rifled muskets were converted at the Springfield Armory in 1866. It soon became apparent that many of the small working parts in the breech system were not going to have a long service life, and the action was too complicated for normal service use. Therefore, before the Model 1865 production order was completed, a less complex rifle was already being tested. This caused the Model 1865 to be called the "First Allin", and the following revised model, the Model 1866, to be called the "Second Allin".

The Model 1865 fired a rimfire .58-60-500 cartridge (.58 inch  bullet,  of black powder), the caliber matching that of the Civil War Minié ball, which was originally used in these rifles.

The Model 1865 quickly became obsolete, and most of them were sold in the 1870s to several American arms dealers. At the time, there was a large demand in the US for shorter cadet-style rifles. To satisfy this need, these dealers cut the barrels and stocks to make short rifles with 33" and 36" barrel lengths. Likewise, the stock wrists were often thinned for cadet use.

See also
Springfield rifle

References
"Historical Dictionary of the U.S. Army" By Jerold E. Brown, Published by Greenwood Publishing Group, 2001
"The .58 and .50 Caliber Rifles and Carbines of the Springfield Armory" by Richard A. Hosmer, Published by North Cape Publications, May 2006

External links

Springfield firearms
Hinged breechblock rifles
Rifles of the United States